Inclusion Canada, formerly the Canadian Association for Community Living is a non-profit organization founded in 1958 to assist in training and socialization of people with intellectual disabilities, then known as Mental Retardation.

History

The organization was founded as the "Canadian Association for Retarded Children". In 1969, the name was changed, to "Canadian Association for the Mentally Retarded". The current name was adopted in 1985.

In 1963, the organization established the "Canadian John F. Kennedy Memorial Fund for Retarded Children". The money raised went to the organization and was used to fund research.

A "Canadian Retarded Children's Week" was also established in 1964 for fundraising, to run from May 6 to 16. The theme was "Flowers of Hope". Cosmos seeds were mailed out as a part of fundraising efforts.

The organization was a proponent of Deinstitutionalisation.

There are branches and subbranches in all Canadian provinces. In 1972, "L'institut National Canadien Francis" merged with the organization to provide French-language services.

During the 1970s NBCAMR operated sheltered workshops in Lindsay, New Brunswick, and other small communities. They were later closed when the organizations goals shifted.

The organization was involved in the Infant K case in 1985, the Eve case, and others involving involuntary contraceptive sterilization.

The organization rebranded from the "Canadian Association for Community Living" to Inclusion Canada on September 14, 2020.

During the COVID-19 pandemic, the organization received a $416,883 grant from the Public Health Agency of Canada's Immunization Partnership Fund to increase uptake of COVID-19 vaccines among people with intellectual disabilities and their families.

See also 
 Community Living Ontario
 R. v. Swain
 sheltered workshop

References 

 Citations – journals

 
 

 Others

External links 
 

Organizations established in 1958
Disability organizations based in Canada
Organizations based in Ontario